Poltorak or Półtorak (from Slavic words meaning "one and a half") may refer to:

 Półtorak, a 17th-century Polish coin equivalent to 1.5 grosz
 Półtorak, a grade of Polish mead made from one part honey and half part water

People 
 Halina Gordon-Półtorak, Polish ice dancer
 David Poltorak, Australian television game show champion
 Piotr Półtorak, guitar player in the Analogs, a Polish street punk band
 Stepan Poltorak (born 1965), Ukrainian military commander and politician

See also